Birkir  is an Icelandic male given name. Notable people with this name include:

 Birkir Bjarnason (born 1988), Icelandic football player
 Birkir Hólm Guðnason (born 1974)
 Birkir Jón Jónsson (born 1979), Icelandic politician
 Birkir Kristinsson (born 1964), Icelandic football player
 Birkir Már Sævarsson (born 1984), Icelandic football player
 Birkir Valur Jónsson (born 1998), Icelandic football player
 Birkir Ívar Guðmundsson, Icelandic handball player

Icelandic masculine given names